The Aleksandriya uezd was one of the subdivisions of the Kherson Governorate of the Russian Empire. It was situated in the northeastern part of the governorate. Its administrative centre was Oleksandriia (Aleksandriya).

Demographics
At the time of the Russian Empire Census of 1897, Aleksandriysky Uyezd had a population of 416,576. Of these, 85.1% spoke Ukrainian, 9.4% Russian, 3.7% Yiddish, 0.7% Moldovan or Romanian, 0.6% Belarusian, 0.3% German and 0.2% Polish as their native language.

References

 
Uezds of Kherson Governorate
Kherson Governorate